Leonard Friend is the musical pseudonym of musician/songwriter/producer Alex Feder.  After the demise of his previous band, The XYZ Affair, Feder moved from Brooklyn to Los Angeles and started recording as Leonard Friend.  His music has been described as a mix of LCD Soundsystem and Justin Timberlake.

His first release was the Lynyrd Frynd EP, with lead single "Serious Music". Nylon Magazine called the latter "the smoothest-sounding debut we've heard in a while".

In 2013 he released a remix of Justin Timberlake's "Suit & Tie".

Discography
 Lynyrd Frynd EP
 LXLF EP

References

Living people
Musicians from New York City
Year of birth missing (living people)